Microkayla pinguis is a species of frog in the family Strabomantidae. It is endemic to Bolivia and only known from its type locality in Inquisivi Province, La Paz Department. It is known from an area consisting of a mixture of elfin forest and pastures, where it was found under stones in a humid stream bed. Smallholder agriculture and climate change are potential threats to this species.

References

Amphibians of the Andes
Amphibians of Bolivia
Endemic fauna of Bolivia
Taxonomy articles created by Polbot
Amphibians described in 1998